It was a Dacian fortified town.

References

Dacian fortresses in Sălaj County
Historic monuments in Sălaj County
History of Crișana

ro:Cetatea dacică de la Marca